The variegated wolf (Canis lupaster soudanicus), also known as the Nubian wolf, is a subspecies of the golden wolf native to Sudan and Somalia. It is smaller and more lightly built than the Egyptian wolf, standing 38 cm (15 in) at the shoulder, and 102 cm (40 in) in length. Compared with more the wolf-like Egyptian wolf, the variegated wolf is built more like a greyhound. The ears are somewhat larger than the Egyptian wolf's and the body colour is generally pale stone-buff, with blotches of black. Its main habitat consists of rocky regions, where it feeds on small mammals and birds. The subspecies has been encountered in elevations of up to 5000 feet in the highlands of Abyssinia.

References

Carnivorans of Africa
Mammals of Sudan
Fauna of Somalia
variegated wolf
variegated wolf